The 1909 United States Senate election in Pennsylvania was held on January 19, 1909. Boies Penrose was re-elected by the Pennsylvania General Assembly to the United States Senate. This was the last Class III U.S. Senate election to be decided by the Pennsylvania General Assembly before the ratification of the 17th Amendment to the U.S. Constitution, which mandated direct election of U.S. Senators.

Results
The Pennsylvania General Assembly, consisting of the House of Representatives and the Senate, convened on January 19, 1909, to elect a Senator to fill the term beginning on March 4, 1909. Incumbent Republican Boies Penrose, who was elected in 1897 and re-elected in 1903, was a successful candidate for re-election to another term. The results of the vote of both houses combined are as follows:

|-
|-bgcolor="#EEEEEE"
| colspan="3" align="right" | Totals
| align="right" | 257
| align="right" | 100.00%
|}

See also 
 1908 and 1909 United States Senate elections

References

External links
Pennsylvania Election Statistics: 1682-2006 from the Wilkes University Election Statistics Project

1909
Pennsylvania
United States Senate